Brookula charleenae is a species of sea snail, a marine gastropod mollusk unassigned in the superfamily Seguenzioidea.

Description
The size of the shell varies between 0.8 mm and 1.4 mm.

Distribution
This marine species occurs off the South Sandwich Islands, found at a depth of 2700 m.

References

 Schwabe E. & Engl W. (2008). Description of two new deep-water species of the genus Brookula Iredale, 1912 (Mollusca, Gastropoda, Trochoidea), with a revision of the genus for the Subantarctic and Arctic Sector of the Atlantic Ocean. Zootaxa, 1866: 187–204
 Engl W. (2012) Shells of Antarctica. Hackenheim: Conchbooks. 402 pp.

charleenae
Gastropods described in 2008